The École Nationale Supérieure d'Agronomie et des Industries Alimentaires (ENSAIA) is a French engineering school located in Vandoeuvre-lès-Nancy near Nancy in the Meurthe-et-Moselle département that specialises in biological and agricultural engineering.

Students can enter the school in different ways, but the most common is by a two-year preparation class.

External links
 

Agricultural universities and colleges
University of Lorraine
Universities in Grand Est
Buildings and structures in Meurthe-et-Moselle
Nancy